The Lutheran Women's Missionary League (LWML) is the official women's auxiliary of The Lutheran Church–Missouri Synod.

The national organization publishes the Lutheran Woman's Quarterly four times a year, and districts usually have their own newsletters.

Since 1998, the LWML has also been known as Lutheran Women in Mission.

LWML Districts 

Wisconsin - Southern Wisconsin
Chesapeake - Maryland, Delaware, Virginia and parts of Pennsylvania, West Virginia and North Carolina, Utah-Idaho

External links 
LWML website
The Lutheran Church — Missouri Synod
LWML Facebook page

Lutheran Church–Missouri Synod
Religious service organizations
Women's organizations based in the United States
Christian women's organizations